The Standish Handicap is a Victoria Racing Club Group 3 Thoroughbred horse race held under open handicap conditions, over a distance of 1200 metres at Flemington Racecourse in Melbourne, Australia in January, traditionally on New Year's Day. The prizemoney Is $250,000.

History
The Standish Handicap is named after Captain Frederick Standish, (1824–1883) a VRC chairman and former Chief Commissioner of police at the time of the bushranger Ned Kelly. Standish is also credited with coming up with an idea to run a race and call it the Melbourne Cup.

1944 Racebook

Distance
 1884–1972 - 6 furlongs
 1973–2005 – 1200 metres
 2006 – 1100 metres
 2007 onwards - 1200 metres

Venue
 1997 the race was run at Moonee Valley Racecourse.
 2006 the race was run at Caulfield Racecourse.

Grade
 1884–1979 - Principal race
 1980 onwards  -  Group 3

Winners

 2023 - Snapper 
 2022 - Halvorsen 
 2021 - Sirius Suspect 
 2020 - Halvorsen 
 2019 - Whispering Brook 
 2018 - Lord Of The Sky 
 2017 - Odyssey Moon
 2016 - Durendal
 2015 - Decircles
 2014 - Flamberge
 2013 - Adamantium
 2012 - Catapulted
 2011 - Ahdashim
 2010 - Royal Ida
 2009 - King Hoaks
 2008 - Publishing
 2007 - Watchyerback
 2006 - Honalee
 2005 - Super Impressive
 2004 - Blessum
 2003 - Super Impressive
 2002 - Lets Planet
 2001 - Iglesia
 2000 - Upright
 1999 - Whistle Up
 1998 - Hon Kwok Star
 1997 - Khaptingly
 1996 - Ben's Rocket
 1995 - Blue Boss
 1994 - Laser Beam
 1993 - Western Voyage
 1992 - Jolly Old Mac
 1991 - Grandiose
 1990 - Strawberry Ranch
 1989 - Grandiose
 1988 - Redelva
 1987 - Burano
 1986 - True Version
 1985 - Maniwreck
 1984 - Warrior King
 1983 - Braw Laddie
 1982 - Hes A Haze
 1981 - Grey Sapphire
 1980 - Rooney
 1979 - Kaoru Coup
 1978 - Rooney
 1977 - Skylea
 1976 - Aurealis
 1975 - Vain Prince
 1974 - Brooklyn
 1973 - Mao's Peak
 1972 - Scarborough Fair
 1971 - Timele
 1970 - Jimeal
 1969 - Ridicule
 1968 - Lord Orpin
 1967 - Top Court
 1966 - Elect
 1965 - Tone
 1964 - Chokra
 1963 - Regolano
 1962 - Monte Bianco
 1961 - Victorious
 1960 - Planetoid
 1959 - Scenic Star
 1958 - Sports Quiz
 1957 - On Parade
 1956 - Fair Chief
 1955 - Cowboy Bill
 1954 - Hyroanie
 1953 - Flying Halo
 1952 - Gay Saint
 1951 - Ungar
 1950 - Ungar
 1949 - Chal
 1948 - High Play
 1947 - Air Marshal
 1946 - David's Last
 1945 - David's Last
 1944 - Phildoll
 1943 - Reception
 1942 - Orteli
 1941 - Manrico
 1940 - Chatsbury
 1939 - Manrico
 1938 - Amiable
 1937 - Cereza
 1936 - Ogwell
 1935 - Press Gang
 1934 - Calulu King
 1933 - Waltzing Lily
 1932 - Bold Bid
 1931 - Umbertana
 1930 - Birdcage
 1929 - Aga Khan
 1928 - Sans Culotte
 1927 - Quintus
 1926 - Trice
 1925 - Valdes
 1924 - Una Carlos
 1923 - Sunburst
 1922 - Whiz Bang
 1921 - Blue Cross
 1920 - Blue Cross
 1919 - Head Wind
 1918 - Perdo
 1917 - Aleconner
 1916 - Eurobin
 1915 - Iownit
 1914 - Captain White
 1913 - Berry Consols
 1912 - Berry Consols
 1911 - Carette
 1910 - Malmsey
 1909 - Dunolly
 1908 - Miss Bobby
 1907 - Miss Bobby
 1906 - Rosebloom
 1905 - Sinnang
 1904 - Silenus
 1903 - Fishery
 1902 - The Victory
 1901 - Duke Of Portland
 1900 - Silvermoor
 1899 - Veloce
 1898 - Embrasure
 1897 - Culzean
 1896 - Lord Charles Scott
 1895 - Fortunatus
 1894 - Parramatta
 1893 - Ascot Vale
 1892 - Barefoot
 1891 - Gladstone
 1890 - Fishwife
 1889 - Boz
 1888 - Mozart
 1887 - William Tell
 1886 - Duration
 1885 - Middlemarch
 1884 - Chuckster

See also
 List of Australian Group races
 Group races

References

External links
 Standish Stakes at Pedigree Query

Horse races in Australia
Flemington Racecourse